Amiwo is a traditional dish in Benin, consisting of porridge made from cornflour and tomato paste. It is often served as a side with fried or grilled chicken or fish.

Preparation 
Amiwo is made out of corn flour, and flavored with ingredients which may include chicken bullion cubes, tomato paste, yellow onion, garlic, salt, pepper water, green hot chillis, shrimp, and palm oil. The ingredients are mixed well and simmer to create a thick, paste-like porridge.

References 

Beninese cuisine
Maize dishes
Tomato dishes